Gontougo Region is one of the 31 regions of Ivory Coast. Since its establishment in 2011, it has been one of two regions in Zanzan District. The seat of the region is Bondoukou and the region's population in the 2021 census was 917,828.

Gontougo is currently divided into five departments: Bondoukou, Koun-Fao, Sandégué, Tanda, and Transua.

Notes

 
Regions of Zanzan District
States and territories established in 2011
2011 establishments in Ivory Coast